Eugenios is a masculine given name. It may refer to:

 Eugenios of Trebizond, 4th century Christian saint and martyr
 E. M. Antoniadi (1870–1944), Greek-French astronomer Eugène Michel Antoniadi, also known as Eugenios Antoniadis
 Eugenios Eugenidis (1882–1954), Greek shipping magnate
 Eugenios Voulgaris (1716–1806), Greek scholar, Greek Orthodox educator and bishop of Kherson

See also
 Eugenio
 Eugene (given name)

Masculine given names